28 Days in the Valley is the second studio album by American rock band Dorothy, released on March 16, 2018, by Roc Nation. It includes the single "Flawless".

Track listing

References

2018 albums
Dorothy (band) albums
Roc Nation albums